Thunderbird Park may refer to:
 Thunderbird Park (Victoria, British Columbia), a public park in Victoria, British Columbia
 Thunderbird Park (Cedar City), a baseball venue on the campus of Southern Utah University in Cedar City, Utah